Seongnam Sports Complex is a group of sports facilities in Seongnam, South Korea.

The complex consists of the Seongnam Stadium, Field hockey field, and Indoor Arena.

Facilities

Seongnam Stadium 
It is a multi-purpose stadium in Seongnam, South Korea. It was built in December 1984 and used for field hockey matches at the 1988 Summer Olympics, but it is currently used mostly for football matches. It was the main stadium of Seongnam Ilhwa Chunma (currently Seongnam FC) until 2004. Now, Seongnam FC uses Tancheon Stadium as their home stadium for most of their games. The stadium holds 27,000 people (21,242 seats) and the city government is considering reconstruction of the stadium, because of its decrepit condition.

Seongnam Indoor Arena 
The Seongnam Indoor Arena with a capacity for 5,711 spectators was used by a volleyball team Seongnam Korea Expressway Corporation Hi-pass Zenith of V-League, until the team was relocated to Gimcheon.

References 
1988 Summer Olympics official report. Volume 1. Part 1. p. 202.
제 11탄 성남제1종합운동장 ①  - Dream stadium of K-League 
제 11탄 성남제1종합운동장 ②  - Dream stadium of K-League

External links 
 Official Site 
 World Stadiums

Venues of the 1988 Summer Olympics
Football venues in South Korea
Athletics (track and field) venues in South Korea
Rugby union stadiums in South Korea
Sports complexes in South Korea
Olympic field hockey venues
Sports venues in Gyeonggi Province
Buildings and structures in Seongnam